Hannibal Gaskin (born August 30, 1997) is a Guyanese swimmer. He competed at the 2016 Summer Olympics (Rio de Janeiro) in the men's 100 metre butterfly event; his time of 58.57 seconds in the heats did not qualify him for the semifinals. He was the flag bearer for Guyana at the Parade of Nations.

He competed at the 2015 in Kazan (Russia) and 2017 World Aquatics Championships in Budapest (Hungary). He also competed at the 2014 Summer Youth Olympics (Nanjing, China) and the 2012 (Istanbul, Turkey) and 2017 World Swimming Championships (25m) (Windsor, Canada).

References

External links 
 https://www.olympic.org/hannibal-gaskin
 https://www.collegeswimming.com/swimmer/420383/
 http://www.olympedia.org/athletes/134311
 https://www.eurosport.com/swimming/hannibal-gaskin_prs341130/person.shtml

Guyanese male swimmers
Olympic swimmers of Guyana
Swimmers at the 2016 Summer Olympics
Swimmers at the 2014 Summer Youth Olympics
1997 births
Living people
Male butterfly swimmers